is a town in Gjøvik Municipality in Innlandet county, Norway. The town is the administrative centre of Gjøvik Municipality.

This makes it the third largest town in Innlandet county (after Hamar and Lillehammer).

The town is located along the river Hunnselva where the river flows into the lake Mjøsa. The town is traditionally an industrial town with several large companies based there including O. Mustad & Son. Gjøvik Church is located in the town. The Gjøvik Olympic Cavern Hall is the world's largest sporting facility that is built into the side of a mountain. It was first built to be used as part of the 1994 Winter Olympics in nearby Lillehammer.

History
Historically, the village of Gjøvik was part of the parish and municipality of Vardal. On 1 January 1861, the village was granted kjøpstad (town) status. At that time, the village was separated from Vardal to form a separate municipality given its new status as a town. Initially, the new town of Gjøvik had 626 residents. On 1 July 1921, a part of Vardal municipality located just outside the town of Gjøvik (population: 723) was annexed into the town. Again, on 1 January 1955, another part of Vardal (population: 1,372) was transferred to the town. During the 1960s, there were many municipal mergers across Norway due to the work of the Schei Committee. On 1 January 1964, the neighboring rural municipalities of Biri, Snertingdal, and Vardal were all merged with the town to form the new, larger Gjøvik Municipality.

Etymology
The town is named after the old Gjøvik farm. The first element is djúpr which means "deep" and the second element is vík which means "inlet".

See also
List of towns and cities in Norway

References

Gjøvik
Cities and towns in Norway
Populated places in Innlandet
1861 establishments in Norway